is a Japanese professional footballer who last played for Young Elephant F.C. in the Lao League 1 as a defender.

Career
After the season ended, he was transferred to Geylang International along with his teammate Takuma Ito. His primary position is a centre back. After the end of the 2013 season, he went on to sign for Tampines Rovers. However, he was deemed as surplus to requirements to the Stags, hence was transferred to Albirex Niigata Singapore once again in the mid-season transfer window of 2014.

Norihiro made his second debut for the White Swans in a 7-1 home victory against Woodlands Wellington on 11 June 2014, where he scored from a header in the 17th minute.

Club statistics
Updated to 22 February 2018.

Honours

Club
Albirex Niigata Singapore
Singapore League Cup: 2011

Tampines Rovers
Singapore Charity Shield: 2014

References

External links

Profile at Tegevajaro Miyazaki

1987 births
Living people
Association football people from Shimane Prefecture
Japanese footballers
J1 League players
J2 League players
J3 League players
Japan Football League players
Singapore Premier League players
JEF United Chiba players
Tochigi SC players
Zweigen Kanazawa players
Albirex Niigata Singapore FC players
Geylang International FC players
Tampines Rovers FC players
SC Sagamihara players
Tegevajaro Miyazaki players
Association football defenders